Miroslav Slušný (born 31 May 1964) is a Slovak ski jumper. He competed in the normal hill and large hill events at the 1994 Winter Olympics.

References

1964 births
Living people
Slovak male ski jumpers
Olympic ski jumpers of Slovakia
Ski jumpers at the 1994 Winter Olympics
Sportspeople from Ružomberok